Adnan Harmandić (born 28 June 1983 in Zenica, Bosnia and Herzegovina) is a Bosnian professional handball player currently playing for RK Bosna from Visoko from 2017.

Career
Clubs:
Čelik Zenica (BIH)
HRK Izviđač (BIH) 
RK Bosna Sarajevo (BIH) 
RK Gorenje (SLO)
Bjerringbro-Silkeborg (DEN) 
HSG Wetzlar (GER)
HSC 2000 Coburg (GER)
RK Bosna Visoko (BiH)

References

Sportspeople from Zenica
Bosnia and Herzegovina male handball players
HSG Wetzlar players
1983 births
Living people